Plexippus lutescens is a species of jumping spider in the genus Plexippus that lives in Namibia and Zimbabwe. The male was first described by Wanda Wesołowska in 2011.

References

Salticidae
Arthropods of Namibia
Arthropods of Zimbabwe
Spiders of Africa
Spiders described in 2011
Taxa named by Wanda Wesołowska